Padne is a village in the southernmost part of the Kasaragod district, state of Kerala, India.

Administration 
Padne village is administered by Padne Grama Panchayat under Nileshwaram Block Panchayat.  Padne Panchayat composed of the villages of Padne and Udinoor. Padne Panchayat is politically a part of Thrikaripur (State Assembly constituency) in Kasaragod (Lok Sabha constituency).

Demographics
As of 2011 Census, Padne village had a population of 21,009 with 9,568 males and 11,441 females. The average male female sex ratio was 1196 higher than the state average of 1084. In Padne, 13.7% of the population was under 6 years of age. Padne village had an average literacy of 92.6% higher than the national average of 74% and lower than state average of 94%: male literacy was 96.2% and female literacy was 89.7%.

Economy

One major industry in Padanna is mussel farming, originally popularized by the CMFR Institute.  As of 2001, it was estimated that over 200 Padanna families were engaged in backwater mussel cultivation. In 2007, a theme village called "Oyster Opera at Padanna" was opened to showcase the mussel farming done in Padanna and other nearby villages.  The tourist site includes demonstrations of mussel farming, local folk art, and cuisine highlighting the locally harvested mussels.

Religion 
Residents of Padanna include Muslims, Hindus and Christians. The main holy sites are Padanna Juma Masjid, Sree Mundya Temple, Town Miouddeen Masjid, and many other masjid and temples.

Educational organizations 
 V K P K H M M R V H S School
 G U P School
 KHIDMATHUL ISLAM English School
 MYMA English School
 I C T English School

Humanitarian work
Autorikshaw drivers of Padanna village spend the income of one day every month to transport poor kidney patient to dialysis centers.  This initiative is undertaken by Swathantra Thozhilali Union.

Transportation
Local roads have access to NH.66 which connects to Mangalore in the north and Kannur in the south. The nearest railway station is Cheruvathur on Mangalore-Palakkad line. There are airports at Mangalore and Kannur.

See also
 Kanhangad
 Cheruvathur
 Nileshwaram
 Kasaragod
 Uduma
 Panathur
 Bekal
 Kayoor
 Kinanoor
 Kavvayi
 Pilicode

References

Cheruvathur area